The 2010 United States Senate election in Nevada took place on November 2, 2010. Incumbent Democratic U.S. Senator and Majority Leader Harry Reid won re-election to a fifth and final term.

Democratic primary 
The Democratic primary took place on June 8, 2010. Reid won by a large margin over a field of political unknowns.

Candidates 
 Harry Reid, incumbent U.S. Senator
 Alex Miller
 Eduardo Hamilton
 Carlo Poliak

Polling

Results

Republican primary 
The Republican primary also took place on Tuesday, June 8, 2010.

Candidates 
 Sharron Angle, former state assemblywoman and candidate for NV-02 in 2006
 John Chachas, businessman
 Chad Christensen, state assemblyman
 Greg Dagani, former member of the Nevada Board of Education
 Chuck Flume, businessman
 Sue Lowden, former state senator
 Mark Noonan, Navy veteran
 Bill Parson, Marine veteran and businessman
 Danny Tarkanian, real estate owner

Endorsements

Lowden

Tarkanian

Angle

Polling 
Includes current candidates who have polled at least 2% in at least one poll.

Results

General election

Candidates 
 Harry Reid (D), incumbent U.S. Senator and Senate Majority Leader
 Sharron Angle (R), former member of the Nevada Assembly
 Scott Ashjian (Tea Party) (campaign site, PVS)
 Tim Fasano (Independent American) (campaign site, PVS)
 Michael Haines (Independent) (campaign site, PVS)
 Jesse Holland (Independent) (campaign site, PVS)
 Jeffrey Reeves (Independent) (campaign site, PVS)
 Wil Stand (Independent) (PVS)

Campaign 
In January 2009, the GOP began running an advertisement attacking Reid for his support of the legislation and President Barack Obama's proposed stimulus plan. Since becoming Minority Leader (in 2004), his approval ratings have dropped below 50%. A November 2007 poll showed Reid's approval rating at 39%, with 49% of voters disapproving.

After the primaries, the first poll showed Angle leading by a double-digit margin. CQ Politics changed their analysis of the race from leaning Republican to a toss-up because of Angle's sharply conservative views and tendency to commit verbal gaffes; however, CQ added that if the voters treat the election as a referendum on Reid, then Angle will likely win.

In 2009, Reid had been endorsed by some prominent Nevada Republicans. Immediately after the primary, the Republican mayor of Reno, Bob Cashell, who had backed Lowden in the Republican primary, endorsed Reid for the general election, calling Angle an "ultra-right winger." Other Republicans expressed doubt about supporting Angle, citing her reputation for ideological rigidity from her years in the state legislature.

One of the first general election ads attacked Angle for her stance on Social Security and Medicare. In response, Angle explained that "the government must continue to keep its contract with seniors, who entered into the system on good faith and now are depending on that contract." In response to accusations that she was not mainstream enough for Nevada voters, Angle explained on a KXNT radio show that she was "more mainstream than the fellow that said tourists stink, this war is lost, and light-skinned no-Negro dialect", in reference to comments that had been made by Senator Reid.

In September, Tibi Ellis, the chairwoman of the Nevada Republican Hispanic Caucus, who had been a spokesperson for Angle, criticized an Angle ad related to immigration. Ellis said, "I condemned this type of propaganda, no matter who is running them, where they blame Mexicans as the only problem and where they attack them as the only source of illegal immigration."

Angle was endorsed by Nevada's largest newspaper, the Las Vegas Review-Journal. Reid had the endorsement from Nevada's second largest newspaper, the Las Vegas Sun. and the largest newspaper outside of Las Vegas, the Reno Gazette-Journal.

On October 7, 2010, Republican State Senator and Minority Leader William Raggio endorsed Reid. Dema Guinn, the widow of the late Republican Nevada Governor Kenny Guinn, endorsed Reid on October 8.

Debate 
Angle and Reid only agreed to one debate, in which no other candidate would participate. It was held on October 14.  Junior Senator John Ensign played Reid during one day of debate preparation at the Trump Plaza in Las Vegas for Angle.

Predictions 
Reid was initially considered vulnerable, with the non-partisan Cook Political Report rating the election as a tossup and the Rothenberg Political Report rating the state as tossup. A June 9, 2010, Rasmussen Reports post-primary poll showed Angle leading incumbent Senator Harry Reid by a margin of 50% to 39%. However, a July 2010 poll showed Senator Reid leading Angle by 7 points, following nationwide attention to some of Angle's positions, as well as the endorsement of Reid by prominent Republicans.  The change of margin, 18% in less than a month, is the largest in Senate elections history. On July 28, 2010, Rasmussen Reports moved the race from tossup to leans Democratic. Later, it moved back to tossup. Polls generally had Angle up, and thus Reid seemed like the underdog. Journalist Jon Ralston correctly predicted Reid would win based on early voting numbers and Reid running a strong campaign.

Polling

Graphical summary

Fundraising

Results 

Despite Angle leading by three points in the polls the days leading up to the election, Reid defeated Angle by 5.74%, even defeating Angle in her own county, Washoe County. Reid also secured huge numbers out of the Democratic stronghold of Clark County, which covers the Las Vegas Metropolitan Area.

References

External links 
 Election Center at the Nevada Secretary of State
 U.S. Congress candidates for Nevada at Project Vote Smart
 Nevada U.S. Senate 2010 from OurCampaigns.com
 Campaign contributions from Open Secrets
 2010 Nevada Senate General Election: All Head-to-Head Matchups graph of multiple polls from Pollster.com
 Election 2010: Nevada Senate from Rasmussen Reports
 2010 Nevada Senate Race from Real Clear Politics
 2010 Nevada Senate Race from CQ Politics
 Race profile from The New York Times
 Election 2010 from Vegas PBS

Debates
 Nevada Primary Senate Candidates Debate, C-SPAN, May 18, 2010
Official campaign sites
 Sharron Angle for U.S. Senate
 Scott Ashjian for U.S. Senate
 John Chachas for U.S. Senate
 Chad Christensen for U.S. Senate
 Jim Duensing for U.S. Senate
 Tim Fasano for U.S. Senate
 Chuck Flume for U.S. Senate
 Michael Haines for U.S. Senate
 Jesse Holland for U.S. Senate
 Sue Lowden for U.S. Senate
 Alex Miller for U.S. Senate
 Jeffrey C. Reeves for U.S. Senate
 Harry Reid for U.S. Senate incumbent
 Danny Tarkanian for U.S. Senate

2010 Nevada elections
Nevada
2010